The 1989 Missouri Tigers football team was an American football team that represented the University of Missouri in the Big Eight Conference (Big 8) during the 1989 NCAA Division I-A football season. The team compiled a 2–9 record (1–6 against Big 8 opponents), finished in sixth place in the Big 8, and was outscored by opponents by a combined total of 363 to 171. Bob Stull was the head coach for the first of five seasons. The team played its home games at Faurot Field in Columbia, Missouri.

The team's statistical leaders included Tommie Stowers with 547 rushing yards, Kent Kiefer with 2,314 passing yards, and Linzy Collins with 803 receiving yards.

Schedule

Coaching staff

References

Missouri
Missouri Tigers football seasons
Missouri Tigers football